Melvin Dimas Rodríguez (born June 12, 1973) is an American actor, best known for starring as Nurse Patsy de la Serda on the HBO comedy Getting On, as Todd Rodriguez on the Fox comedy The Last Man on Earth, and as Ernie Gomes on the Showtime drama On Becoming a God in Central Florida. Other notable works include recurring as Marco Pasternak on AMC's Better Call Saul and co-starring on the short-lived Fox sitcoms Running Wilde and Enlisted. In 2021, Rodriguez appeared in the crime television series CSI: Vegas.

Life and career
Rodríguez was born in Miami, Florida, and grew up in its Little Havana neighborhood. He first pursued a career in boxing, until he was led onto the path of acting by his high school teacher at age 17, first starring in an AIDS awareness play entitled The Inner Circle with Pedro Zamora. He dropped out of high school and managed to receive a scholarship, which he used to graduate from SUNY Purchase. After his graduation, Rodríguez stayed in Purchase and managed a cigar shop, from time to time visiting New York City to act on stage. He did his first role on screen in 1999 in an episode of the legal drama television series Law & Order, which was filming in the state. Rodríguez then moved to Los Angeles, focusing more on his career in the film industry and less on his acting on stage. His first role in a full-length feature film was in the 1999 comedy Wirey Spindell. He achieved his breakthrough by scoring the recurring role of Frank on the ABC comedy series George Lopez in 2002.

Rodríguez is most known for his recurring roles as Sgt. Núñez on Community and SPC Chubowski on the Fox sitcom Enlisted. He portrayed Marco Pasternak, the best friend and partner-in-crime of Jimmy McGill in the first and third seasons of Better Call Saul. He had a brief role as Officer Morales in the 2002 film Panic Room, and was a main cast member on The Last Man on Earth (2015). He also appeared as Officer Martinez in Little Miss Sunshine (2006).

Rodriguez decided to depart CSI: Vegas after its first season as Medical Examiner Hugo Ramirez.

Filmography

Film

Television

Music videos

References

External links
 

1973 births
American male actors
Living people
State University of New York at Purchase alumni
American entertainers of Cuban descent
American people of Cuban descent
20th-century American male actors
21st-century American male actors
Hispanic and Latino American male actors
Hispanic and Latino American entertainers